Marcus Anthony Slaughter (born March 18, 1985) is an American professional basketball player who last played for AEK Athens of the Greek Basket League and the Basketball Champions League. He completed his collegiate career playing for the San Diego State Aztecs.

Professional career
After going undrafted in the 2006 NBA draft, he signed a contract with the Turkish team Pınar Karşıyaka. He had a productive season with Karşıyaka, averaging 13.3 points, 10.1 rebounds, 1.2 blocks and 2.3 steals per game. He was also named MVP of the 2007 Turkish All-Star game. Then he was signed a two-year contract with the Miami Heat in June 2007, but was released October 29, 2007.

For the 2007–08 season he has signed with the Israeli team Hapoel Jerusalem. After being released by Hapoel Jerusalem, he signed with BCM Gravelines Dunkerque of the French Pro A League.

In the 2008–09 season, he signed a one-year contract with the German club Eisbären Bremerhaven. In August 2009, he signed a one-year contract with SLUC Nancy of the French Pro A League.

On July 27, 2010, he signed a one-year contract with CB Valladolid. At the end of the 2010–11 ACB season, Slaughter was prized with the ACB Most Spectacular Player award.

In July 2011, he signed a one-year contract with the German club Brose Baskets. One year later, and after winning the 2011–12 German League and the German Cup title, Slaughter came back to Spain and signed with EuroLeague and Spanish powerhouse Real Madrid. In August 2013, he extended his contract with Real Madrid until the end of 2013–14 season.

In 2014–15 season, Real Madrid won the EuroLeague, after defeating Olympiacos, by a score of 78–59, in the EuroLeague Finals. Real Madrid eventually finished the season by also winning the Spanish League championship, after a series 3–0 win in the league's final series against FC Barcelona. In all, they managed to win the triple crown during the season. In September 2015, he parted ways with Real Madrid.

On September 6, 2015, he signed a two-year deal with the Turkish team Darüşşafaka Doğuş.

On August 14, 2017, Slaughter signed with the Italian team Virtus Bologna for the 2017–18 season.

On August 9, 2019, he signed with AEK Athens of the Greek Basket League. Slaughter averaged 4.8 rebounds, 4.6 points and 1.1 assists per game. He re-signed with the team on July 28, 2020.

Career statistics

EuroLeague

|-
| style="text-align:left;"| 2011–12
| style="text-align:left;"| Brose Baskets
| 10 || 10 || 25.9 || .564 || .000 || .714 || 7.2 || 1.5 || 1.7 || 1.4 || 11.8 || 17.7
|-
| style="text-align:left;"| 2012–13
| style="text-align:left;" rowspan=3| Real Madrid
| 29 || 2 || 19.3 || .660 || .000 || .386 || 3.6 || .4 || .9 || .7 || 5.0 || 6.8
|-
| style="text-align:left;"| 2013–14
| 31 || 0 || 12.3 || .689 || .000 || .471 || 2.4 || .5 || .6 || .3 || 3.2 || 4.0
|-
| style="text-align:left;background:#AFE6BA;"| 2014–15†
| 27 || 0 || 12.2 || .640 || .000 || .485 || 2.1 || .6 || 1.0 || .2 || 3.0 || 4.2
|-
| style="text-align:left;"| 2015–16
| style="text-align:left;"| Darüşşafaka
| 24 || 0 || 16.0 || .632 || .000 || .740 || 3.8 || .8 || .6 || .9 || 4.5 || 7.9
|-
| style="text-align:left;"| 2016–17
| style="text-align:left;"| Darüşşafaka
| 13 || 3 || 15.1 || .577 || .000 || .571 || 2.6 || .5 || .5 || .4 || 3.2 || 3.5

|- class="sortbottom"
| style="text-align:left;"| Career
| style="text-align:left;"|
| 121 || 12 || 15.8 || .636 || .000 || .571 || 3.3 || .6 || .8 || .6 || 4.6 || 6.6

Domestic leagues

Awards and accomplishments

Pro career
2012 Spanish Supercup: Winner
2013 Spanish League: Champion
2013 Spanish Supercup: Winner
2014 Spanish King's Cup: Winner
2014 Spanish Supercup: Winner
2015 Spanish King's Cup: Winner
2015 EuroLeague: Champion
2015 Spanish League: Champion

References

External links

 Official website
 Marcus Slaughter at acb.com
 Marcus Slaughter at draftexpress.com
 Marcus Slaughter at eurobasket.com
 Marcus Slaughter at euroleague.net
 Marcus Slaughter at tblstat.net
 
 

1985 births
Living people
AEK B.C. players
African-American basketball players
American expatriate basketball people in France
American expatriate basketball people in Germany
American expatriate basketball people in Israel
American expatriate basketball people in Italy
American expatriate basketball people in Spain
American expatriate basketball people in Turkey
Basketball players from California
BCM Gravelines players
Brose Bamberg players
CB Valladolid players
Centers (basketball)
Darüşşafaka Basketbol players
Eisbären Bremerhaven players
Hapoel Jerusalem B.C. players
Israeli Basketball Premier League players
Karşıyaka basketball players
Lega Basket Serie A players
Liga ACB players
Real Madrid Baloncesto players
Power forwards (basketball)
San Diego State Aztecs men's basketball players
SLUC Nancy Basket players
STB Le Havre players
Virtus Bologna players
American men's basketball players
Bahçeşehir Koleji S.K. players
21st-century African-American sportspeople
20th-century African-American people